Exechia festiva is a species of 'fungus gnat' in the family Mycetophilidae.

References 

Mycetophilidae
Insects described in 1863